The Dutch were in most of the Olympic sailing competitions represented by the Dutch Olympic Sailing Team. The selection of the members of the team was done by the Koninklijk Nederlands Watersport Verbond (KNWV) or its predecessor. With the exception of 1908 and 1912 there were always Dutch sailors willing to compete at this pinnacle of competitive sailing. Even in 1956 in Melbourne the Dutch team was willing and able to perform. However at the last possible moment the Dutch NOC and the Dutch government (together with Switzerland and Spain), ordered a boycott of these games. This boycott was a result of the presence in Hungary of the Soviet Union after the Hungarian Revolution. The KNWV was not in favor of this boycott.

Listed below is an overview of all Olympic games and events which the Dutch Olympic Sailing Team was selected for. The list includes all sailors, substitutes and when known, the officials that supported the team:

The Gentleman years
Source:

1896 Athens, 
 1896 Summer Olympics
 Sailing program cancelled due to weather conditions
 No knowledge of Dutch representation in sailing

1900 Paris, 
 Sailing at the 1900 Summer Olympics

1904 St. Louis, 
 1904 Summer Olympics
 Sailing was not a part of the Olympic program

1908 Ryde (Isle of Wight) & Hunter’s Quay (Firth of Clyde), 
 Sailing at the 1908 Summer Olympics
 No Dutch representation

1912 Stockholm, 
 Sailing at the 1912 Summer Olympics
 No Dutch representation

1916 Berlin, 
 Cancelled due to World War I

The Yachtsmen years

1920 Ostend, 
 Sailing at the 1920 Summer Olympics

1924 Paris, 
 Sailing at the 1924 Summer Olympics

1928 Amsterdam, 
 Sailing at the 1928 Summer Olympics

1932 Los Angeles, 
 Sailing at the 1932 Summer Olympics

1936 Kiel, 
 Sailing at the 1936 Summer Olympics

1940 Tokio, 
 1940 Summer Olympics
 Rescheduled to Helsinki
 No Dutch team assigned

1940 Helsinki, 
 1940 Summer Olympics
 Cancelled due to World War II

1944
 Not scheduled

The Innovator years

1948 Torbay, 
 Sailing at the 1948 Summer Olympics

1952 Helsinki, 
 Sailing at the 1952 Summer Olympics
 Accommodation
 The sailors of the 1952 Dutch Olympic Sailing Team were accommodated by members of the local Finish Yacht Club. The club house of that club is a fortress over 200 years old. The Dutch boats were moored on an island called: Merenkävijät what can be loosely translated into pirates'''. Also the Dutch Royal Yacht Piet Hein was moored at the island.
 Transport
 The Dutch Olympic boats were transported over sea by the coaster Marvic''

1956 Melbourne, 
 Sailing at the 1956 Summer Olympics

Naples, 
 Sailing at the 1960 Summer Olympics

Enoshima, 
 Sailing at the 1964 Summer Olympics

The Sailors years

Acapulco, 
 Sailing at the 1968 Summer Olympics

1972 Kiel, 
 Sailing at the 1972 Summer Olympics

1976 Kingston, 
 Sailing at the 1976 Summer Olympics

1980 Tallinn, 
 Sailing at the 1980 Summer Olympics

1984 Long Beach, 
 Sailing at the 1984 Summer Olympics

The Athlete years

1988 Pusan, 
 Sailing at the 1988 Summer Olympics

1992 Barcelona, 
 Sailing at the 1992 Summer Olympics

1996 Savannah, 
 Sailing at the 1996 Summer Olympics

The Performers years

2000 Sydney, 
 Sailing at the 2000 Summer Olympics

2004 Athens, 
 Sailing at the 2004 Summer Olympics

2008 Qingdao, 
 Sailing at the 2008 Summer Olympics

2012 Weymouth, 
 Sailing at the 2012 Summer Olympics

2016 Rio de Janeiro, 
 Sailing at the 2016 Summer Olympics

References

Sources

Olympic sailors of the Netherlands